A first-surface mirror or front-surface mirror (also commonly abbreviated FS mirror or FSM) is a mirror with the reflective surface being above a backing, as opposed to the conventional, second-surface mirror with the reflective surface behind a transparent substrate such as glass or acrylic.

Historically, the bronze mirror, an FSM type, was standard from ancient times until relatively recent centuries.  These were simply highly polished pieces of bronze or other metals, usually small and round, and designed for a person to see their face. 

First-surface mirrors are now made for applications requiring a strict reflection without a ghosting effect as seen with a second-surface mirror, where a faint secondary reflection could be observed, coming from the front surface of the glass. This includes most optics applications where light is being manipulated in a specific manner. Reflecting telescopes, rear-projection televisions, periscopes, non-reversing mirrors, high-quality kaleidoscopes, and the animation process.

In cases where the mirror is subjected to extreme cold (as low as 33 K as in the James Webb Space Telescope), a polished pure beryllium mirror is used without a first-surface coating in order to eliminate deformations caused by differing coefficients of thermal expansion.

Silvering 

The "silvering" on a front-surface mirror is usually aluminium for visible light and gold for infrared radiation.

References

Mirrors